Joan Manuel Cruz Castro (born April 4, 2003) is a Chilean footballer who currently plays for club Colo-Colo as a midfielder.

Club career
He arrived to Colo-Colo at the age of 7 years and signed his first contract as professional player on 2019, before playing at the 2019 FIFA U17 World Cup. Also, he has played at the 2020 U20 Copa Libertadores.

International career
On April 2019, Cruz took part of the Chile U15 squad at the UEFA U-16 Development Tournament in Finland. After, he was called up to Chile U17 to play at the 2019 FIFA U17 World Cup, appearing at the four matches played by Chile and scoring two goals in the last match against Brazil U17. He represented Chile U20 at the friendly tournament Copa Rául Coloma Rivas, playing three matches and scoring a goal against Colombia U20. and at four friendly matches against Paraguay U20 and Peru U20 on 2022. In the 2022 South American Games, he made 2 appearances. In 2023, he made three appearances in the South American U20 Championship.

In September 2020, he was called up to the training microcycle of the Chile national team.

Personal life
He was named Joan Manuel in honor of the Spanish musician Joan Manuel Serrat.

Honours

Club
Colo-Colo
 Copa Chile (2): 2019, 2021

References

External links
 
 Joan Cruz at laroja.cl

Living people
2003 births
Footballers from Santiago
Chilean footballers
Chile youth international footballers
Chile under-20 international footballers
Chilean Primera División players
Colo-Colo footballers
Association football midfielders
Competitors at the 2022 South American Games